AP Player of the Year may refer to:

In collegiate sports:
Associated Press College Basketball Player of the Year
Associated Press College Football Player of the Year

In professional sports:
Associated Press NFL Most Valuable Player Award
Associated Press NFL Offensive Player of the Year Award
Associated Press NFL Defensive Player of the Year Award

See also
Associated Press Athlete of the Year

Associated Press awards